Many inhabited places in Florina Prefecture of Greece have both Slavic and Greek forms. Some of the forms are identifiably of Greek origin, others of Slavic, yet others of Turkish or more obscure origins.

References

External links
  List compiled by the Institute for Neohellenic Research

Populated places in Florina (regional unit)
Lists of former place names in Greece